, son of regent Michiie, was a kugyō or Japanese court noble of the Kamakura period. He held regent positions kampaku from 1231 to 1232 and  sessho from 1232 to 1235. Tadaie was his son.

Family
 Father: Kujō Michiie
 Mother: Sainonji Rinshi (1192-1251)
 Wife and Children:
 Wife: Fujiwara Yuko, Fujiwara Sadasue’s daughter
 Kujō Tadaie
 Wife: Saionji Yoshiko
 Kujō Genshi (1227-1262) married Emperor Shijō
unknown:
 Soshin (1228-1283）
 ??? (済助)

References
 

1210 births
1235 deaths
Fujiwara clan
Kujō family
People of Kamakura-period Japan